Megaphorus is a genus of robber flies in the family Asilidae. There are about 18 described species in Megaphorus.

Species
These 18 species belong to the genus Megaphorus:

 Megaphorus acrus (Curran, 1931) i c g b
 Megaphorus brunneus (Cole, 1964) c g
 Megaphorus clausicellus (Macquart, 1850) i c g b
 Megaphorus durangoensis Cole & Pritchard, 1964 c g
 Megaphorus flavidus (Cole, 1964) c g b
 Megaphorus frustra Cole & Pritchard, 1964 c
 Megaphorus frustrus (PRITCHARD, 1935) c g b
 Megaphorus guildiana (Williston, 1885) i c g
 Megaphorus intermedius (Tucker, 1907) i c g
 Megaphorus laphroides (Wiedemann, 1828) i c g b
 Megaphorus lascrucensis (Cole, 1964) i c g
 Megaphorus martinorum (Cole, 1964) i c g
 Megaphorus megachile (Coquillett, 1893) i c g b
 Megaphorus minutus (Macquart, 1834) i c g b
 Megaphorus pallidus (Johnson, 1958) i c g b
 Megaphorus prudens (Pritchard, 1935) i c g b
 Megaphorus pulchrus (Pritchard, 1935) i c g
 Megaphorus willistoni (Cole, 1964) i c g b

Data sources: i = ITIS, c = Catalogue of Life, g = GBIF, b = Bugguide.net

References

Further reading

 
 
 

Asilidae
Articles created by Qbugbot
Asilidae genera